Bokov is a Slavic masculine surname, its feminine counterpart is Bokova or Boková. It may refer to
Georgi Bokov (1920–1989), member of Bulgarian resistance movement during World War II
Irina Bokova (born 1952), Bulgarian politician
Jana Boková, Czech film director
Maksim Bokov (born 1973), Russian football player and coach